Valeriy Sokolenko (born 21 June 1982 in Chernihiv) is a Ukrainian footballer.

Career
He played for Chornomorets Odesa. In the past, Sokolenko also played for such teams as Borysfen Boryspil-2, FC Enerhetyk Burshtyn, Górnik Łęczna, FC Desna Chernihiv, Polonia Bytom, and FC Energie Cottbus in the German 2. Bundesliga
.

References

1982 births
Living people
Footballers from Chernihiv
FC Desna Chernihiv players
Ukrainian footballers
Ukrainian expatriate footballers
Expatriate footballers in Poland
Expatriate footballers in Germany
Association football defenders
Górnik Łęczna players
Polonia Bytom players
FC Energie Cottbus players
JKS 1909 Jarosław players
FC Avanhard Koriukivka players
Ukrainian expatriate sportspeople in Poland
Ukrainian expatriate sportspeople in Germany